The 2022 Catalan motorcycle Grand Prix (officially known as the Gran Premi Monster Energy de Catalunya) was the ninth round of the 2022 Grand Prix motorcycle racing season. It was held at the Circuit de Barcelona-Catalunya in Montmeló on 5 June 2022.

Qualifying

MotoGP

Marc Márquez was sidelined due to arm surgery and missed several races. He was replaced by Stefan Bradl.

Race

MotoGP

Moto2

Moto3

 Diogo Moreira withdrew from the event due to effects of hand injury suffered at the previous round in Mugello.

Championship standings after the race
Below are the standings for the top five riders, constructors, and teams after the round.

MotoGP

Riders' Championship standings

Constructors' Championship standings

Teams' Championship standings

Moto2

Riders' Championship standings

Constructors' Championship standings

Teams' Championship standings

Moto3

Riders' Championship standings

Constructors' Championship standings

Teams' Championship standings

References

External links

2022 MotoGP race reports
2022 in Spanish motorsport
2022
June 2022 sports events in Spain